The following is a list of recurring Saturday Night Live characters and sketches introduced between September 29, 1990, and May 18, 1991, the sixteenth season of SNL.

Larry Roman the Talent Scout
A Dana Carvey sketch. Debuted September 29, 1990.

Simon
Simon is a sketch about a young British boy, played by Mike Myers, who likes to draw, and has his own BBC television program, Simon. The sketches always begin by showing the BBC logo with a faux British announcer back-announcing some ridiculously insipid sounding programming on right before it. The show borrows its theme song from a British children's television series called Simon in the Land of Chalk Drawings, though, aside from the concept of a young boy who draws, the premises are completely dissimilar. Simon broadcasts his program from his bathtub, in which he appears to be nude. On the show, Simon displays his drawings (pronounced drawerings in an exaggerated British accent), which he bends over to pick up, whereupon he scolds the audience, by yelling his catch phrases, "Are you looking at my bum?" and calling the audience "Bum Lookers!" and "Cheeky Monkeys!"

His drawings often depict scenes that are disturbing or morbidly violent, presented with a naïve and childlike innocence. His mother is deceased (or, as he refers to it, "with the angels"), and his father is somewhat of a reprobate who associates with nefarious figures (and his "new auntie who sleeps over") and leaves Simon unattended for long periods of time while he gambles. Simon has a typically juvenile sense of humour. He sometimes has guests on his show, who appear in the bathtub with Simon, and also show their drawings (which are equally as disturbing as Simon's). Simon typically ends his show when he determines that he has been in the tub too long, as indicated by his "prune hands." Debuted November 10, 1990.

Appearances

The Dark Side with Nat X
In the early 1990s, Chris Rock portrayed "Nat X", a militant talk show host with a huge Afro hairstyle. He once remarked that he had only a 15-minute show because, as he explained, if he had any more, "The Man" would regard it as welfare. Many of Rock's original comedy bits were incorporated into Nat X's dialogue.

Segments on The Dark Side include the "White Man Cam" in which a video cam with a police siren sound effect walks up to Nat X's desk and places a graphic image of prison bars in front of him as he screams and mimics being in prison until the White Man Cam goes away. Another segment includes the Top 5 lists because "Ten would make The Man lose sleep.".

Nat X was cruel to all of his guests, "greeting" nearly all of them with, "Sit yo' ass down!"  Perhaps the most memorable episode featured host Kevin Bacon as Vanilla Ice. Nat told Ice that he could not dance, and even persuaded his other guest, Colin Powell, to dance with him in order to show Ice how to do it.

When Sinbad hosted, he appeared as Joseph Jackson, who tries to make excuses for the infamous abuse his children suffered, as depicted in the then-current TV miniseries The Jacksons: An American Dream. However, Nat insists on complimenting Jackson for his proficiency with violence, marveling that Jackson "hit Jackie so hard, his Afro wig flew off!" 

Spike Lee made a surprise appearance as himself on another episode, donning an "X" cap that was made popular by his film Malcolm X. Not knowing this at first, Nat explained to him that he had been seeing these caps all over town but had personally not seen a dime in profits.

Chris Farley often appeared as "Sandman", a manic clown armed with a broom who swept guests away when Nat had had enough of them. Sandman was modeled after Howard "Sandman" Simms from Showtime at the Apollo, who performed the same function on that show's famed "Amateur Night" episodes, when substandard performers fell short of audience approval.

Appearances

The Doormen
A Rob Schneider and Kevin Nealon sketch. Debuted November 10, 1990.

Appearances

Pat

Julia Sweeney plays an androgynous character. Debuted December 1, 1990.

Appearances

Uri (Sabra)
A Tom Hanks sketch.  This character was portrayed as an obnoxious, over-sexed owner of an electronics boutique.  Debuted December 8, 1990.

Bill Swerski's Superfans

A group of Chicago sports fans discuss upcoming sporting events. Debuted January 12, 1991.

Appearances

I'm Chillin'
I'm Chillin was a spoof of public-access television cable TV rap shows. Its host was played by Chris Rock and the show's sidekick was played by Chris Farley. Farley's character was introduced by Rock with a string of nonsensical rhymes such as "My Ace in the hole, my buttered roll, my grassy knoll, my Esther Rolle" etc. This show was notable for its "Mother Joke of the Day" which would be sent in from (fictitious) viewers, all of whom lived in one housing project or another. The winner would typically receive some early-Nineties-themed gangster item (a red, yellow and green jacket with an 8-ball on the back, for example). Chris Rock's character was named Onski and Chris Farley's character was B-Fats. Onski also plugged local fictitious sponsors, like "Bullet Hole tampons: 'cause sometimes you bleed in other places!", and "F'ed Up Malt Liquor." The sketch usually came to an end when Onski received a beeper page from his "baby's mama" and he'd have to go pick her up somewhere (from work at Popeyes, or the check cashing place). Onski's parting words each episode were "Always wipe, stay off the pipe, and if someone gets in your face, tell em 'I'm Chillin!'" Debuted January 12, 1991.

Appearances

Deep Thoughts

Jack Handey offers interstitial one-liners. Debuted January 19, 1991.

The Elevator Fans
A Dana Carvey and Kevin Nealon sketch. Debuted January 19, 1991.

Appearances

The Richmeister (Copy Room Guy, "Makin' Copies!")
Rob Schneider plays an obnoxious office worker who sits around the copy room all day riffing on the names of his coworkers as they make copies. Debuted January 19, 1991.

Appearances

Coffee Talk with Linda Richman

The January 19, 1991 episode introduced a talk show called "Coffee Talk with Paul Baldwin", with Mike Myers playing host Paul Baldwin.  However, the sketch was thereafter retooled, becoming "Coffee Talk with Linda Richman" as of its third appearance on October 12, 1991.  Mike Myers now played the show's new host, an older Jewish woman.

Appearances

Daily Affirmation with Stuart Smalley

Al Franken plays the effeminate host of a self-help show. Debuted February 9, 1991.  The Stuart Smalley character became the basis for a feature film released in 1995.

Appearances

Frank Gannon, P.I. P.I.
Kevin Nealon plays a "P.I. P.I.", an abbreviation for "Politically Incorrect Private Investigator." He is a private investigator who is always saying politically incorrect statements, or making politically incorrect conclusions. Debuted April 13, 1991.

References

Lists of recurring Saturday Night Live characters and sketches
Saturday Night Live in the 1990s
Saturday Night Live
Saturday Night Live